Kékes   is 
It is Hungary's third most popular tourist attraction, after Lake Balaton and the Danube, and has a number of hotels and skiing pistes. The Kékestető TV Tower stands at the summit.

The name Kékes is derived from the mountain's often bluish colour. In Hungarian, the word  means 'blue', while  means implicitly 'bluish'.

History
It is home to the former Pauline Monastery of Kékes.

Climate

Road cycling
For road bicycle racing enthusiasts, the mountain can be climbed by two main routes.

 South from Gyöngyös: 839 m over 17.8 km. This is the most famous and difficult ascent. 
 North from Parád: 775 m over 16.9 km. About equal in difficulty as the Bédoin ascent, but better sheltered against the climb.

Tour de Hongrie stage finishes

See also
 List of highest paved roads in Europe
 List of highest paved roads in Europe by country

References

External links

Mountains of Hungary
Tourist attractions in Hungary
Mountains of the Western Carpathians
Geography of Heves County
Tourist attractions in Heves County
Highest points of countries